Fuck Off! is an EP by American rapper Shaggy 2 Dope inspired by the success of "Fuck Off!", the rapper's first solo single. "Fuck Off!", the single, was released on November 22, 1994 through Psychopathic Records. Written by Insane Clown Posse, it was recorded at Pulsar Sound Studio and produced by Mike E. Clark.

Copies of the single sported a cover drawn by Shaggy 2 Dope himself; the same artwork would be used on the Fuck Off! EP's cover.

Copies of the single also contained a booklet with an advertisement for a Shaggy solo LP titled Shaggs The Clown. After sampling problems and numerous delays, however, the album was eventually scrapped.

Track listing for the single

Personnel
Joseph "Shaggy 2 Dope" Utsler – lyrics, vocals, cover art
Joseph "Violent J" Bruce – lyrics
Mike E. Clark – programming, engineering, producer

Fuck Off! EP

After the release of the eponymous single, Fuck Off! was repackaged as an extended play in 1994, containing the single's main track and flipside track and two additional tracks. A reissue of the EP was released in late 1999. Another reissue of the EP was released on July 22, 2003, which peaked at No. 42 on the US Billboard Independent Albums chart. The EP was reissued again for a vinyl edition on November 29, 2019.

Track listing for the EP

Charts

Release history

References

External links 

1999 debut EPs
1994 debut singles
Shaggy 2 Dope albums
Psychopathic Records EPs
Songs written by Violent J
Songs written by Shaggy 2 Dope
Albums produced by Mike E. Clark